OSF Global Services is a company specialized in enterprise customer relationship management (CRM), content management systems (CMS), order management systems (OMS), unified commerce, online shop management and cloud application development. The company provides products across channels, devices and locales to B2C and B2B focused enterprises and emerging businesses in North America, Europe, Latin America, Australia, New Zealand and Asia. 

Headquartered in Quebec City, Quebec, Canada, OSF Global Services has offices in the United States, the United Kingdom, France, Germany, Brazil, Colombia, Japan, Romania, Ukraine and others.

History
OSF Global Services was founded in 2003 in Québec City, Canada, with operations in Bucharest.

Over the years, OSF Global Services signed strategic partnerships with Demandware (now Salesforce Commerce Cloud), Salesforce.com, Microsoft, Sitecore, Magento, Coveo and OrderDynamics.

In 2006, the company began to offer IT development and consulting services, and in 2007, it became a Microsoft Gold Partner. In 2010, it signed a strategic partnership with Salesforce.

In May 2018, OSF acquired Brazilian IT company iFactory Solutions as part of OSF’s continued expansion in the Latin American region.  

In May 2019, OSF acquired award-winning UK eCommerce agency Blueleaf as part of its strategy to build a significant presence in the UK.

In October 2019, OSF acquired Spanish ecommerce agency Soul Ecommerce to enhance its capabilities in the Iberian Peninsula region.

In December 2019, OSF acquired German ecommerce agency successyou as a part of its strategy to build upon the company’s existing presence in Europe.

In 2019, the company started a long-term collaboration with Reforest'Action, an NGO with a unique crowd planting model dedicated to raising awareness and taking action for forests by creating an environmentally conscious community. Inspired by this initiative, OSF Digital decided to replicate its global digital footprint into a worldwide climate change program, OSF Forest.

In 2020, OSF Digital joined Pledge 1% philanthropic program.

In 2021, the company acquired Adept Group in New Zealand, Relation1 based in Canada, Werise in LATAM and the US-based Paladin Group.

In 2022, OSF Digital acquired netnomics (Germany), Datarati (ANZ), and completed acquisition of FitForCommerce (US).

In June 2022, OSF Digital acquired Kolekto, a Brazil-based digital B2B commerce and CRM company.   In July 2022, OSF Digital acquired Aarin Inc., a U.S.-based full-stack Salesforce Marketing Cloud systems integrator, for an undisclosed sum.

Awards and honors
The company won Salesforce’s Partner Innovation Award in Retail at Dreamforce 2016 and the Lightning Bolt Trailblazer Award for Retail at Dreamforce 2018.

In 2019 OSF Digital was recognized with Salesforce France Award in the ‘Trust’ Category, won a Bolty Award for Best Digital Experience in the RCG category, and a Salesforce Partner Innovation Award in the ‘Customer360’ category. OSF Digital was named to Fast Company’s list of the 50 Best Workplaces for Innovators in 2019.

In 2020 OSF Digital received Salesforce partner Award for the ‘Most relevant Commerce Cloud project’ in Iberia.

In 2021, OSF Digital won Salesforce Sales Excellence Partner award and Salesforce Partner Innovation Award in the Communications industry category.

In 2022, OSF Digital was named Salesforce Partner of the Year by Salesforce Japan and was awarded the 2022 Salesforce Commerce Cloud Partner of the Year for the Best Go Faster with Commerce category.

References

Software companies of the United States
Computer companies of Canada
Companies based in Quebec City
Computer companies established in 2003
2003 establishments in Quebec